Bádice is a village and municipality in the Nitra District in western central Slovakia, in the Nitra Region.

Genealogical resources

The records for genealogical research are available at the state archive "Statny Archiv in Nitra,  Slovakia"

 Roman Catholic church records (births/marriages/deaths): 1696-1895
 Census records 1869 of Badice are not available at the state archive.

See also
 List of municipalities and towns in Slovakia

References

External links
https://web.archive.org/web/20071116010355/http://www.statistics.sk/mosmis/eng/run.html
Surnames of living people in Badice

Villages and municipalities in Nitra District